Clifton Place is a historic mansion on a former plantation in Giles County, Tennessee, U.S.. It was built in 1812 for Tyree Rodes, Sr. The plantation had slaves. It has been listed on the National Register of Historic Places since April 11, 1973.

References

Houses on the National Register of Historic Places in Tennessee
Houses completed in 1812
Houses in Giles County, Tennessee
Antebellum architecture
Plantation houses in Tennessee